The Men's 10 metre platform competition at the 1973 World Aquatics Championships was held on 8 and 9 September 1973.

Results
Green denotes finalists

References
Official Results

Men's 10 metre platform